Ivan Sergeyevich Yarygin (7 November 1948 – 11 October 1997) was a Soviet and Russian heavyweight freestyle wrestler. Between 1970 and 1980 he won all his major international competitions, except for the 1970 and 1974 European championships where he placed second. Yarygin was an Olympic champion in 1972 and 1976, being the first wrestler to go through an Olympic competition with straight pin victories and no foul points, a world champion in 1973, a World Cup winner five times, has never lost a single match in World Cup competition, and a European champion in 1972 and 1975–76, and won a world cup in 1973, 1976–77 and 1979–80. He also set a record for the fastest pin victory in the World Cup history at 27 seconds. After retiring in 1980, he headed the Soviet freestyle wrestling team from 1982 to 1992 and the Russian Wrestling Federation from 1993 until his untimely death in a car crash in 1997. An exceptional upper-body wrestler, Yarygin was widely regarded for his tremendous physique and high-strength aggressive style, always aiming to pin down his opponents, with most of his stoppage wins came by way of fall achieved through rapid fireman's lift and slamming the opponent to the mat. One of the most prestigious tournaments in the World was put together in his honor - The Golden Grand Prix Ivan Yarygin Tournament is held annually in Krasnoyarsk, Russia, and has the reputation of being one of the hardest tournaments in the World. The Yarygin Memorial annually sees the world's best wrestlers come to Siberia, with the added element that Russia's autonomous oblasts and republics such as Dagestan and Chechnya field independent teams alongside an All-Russia selection.

Biography

Childhood and early career
Yarygin was born as the sixth child in a family of ten siblings. Most members of his family were heavily built and physically active people. Since early age Yarygin helped his father at his blacksmith workshop. As a teenager he wanted to become a football goalkeeper, and took up wrestling only in 1966, aged 18. He then was drafted and went on to win the Soviet Armed Forces heavyweight championships in Sambo wrestling, gaining the Master of Sports degree in Sambo. He then switched to freestyle wrestling, and won 1968 RSFSR national youth championships and 1969 Soviet youth championships.

Prime years
In 1970, he won the Soviet title competing in senior division, beating his main rival Vladimir Gulyutkin; he lost to Gulyutkin in 1971, but beat him again at the 1972 Olympic Trials and was selected for the Munich Olympics. At the Olympics he won all five bouts by fall, spending on the mat a little more than 7 minutes instead of 45. Three months prior to the Olympics, he won the 1972 European Championships, winning all bouts by fall. When first appeared in the United States for the 1973 World Cup and the subsequent wrestling tour, the  U.S.—Soviet Olympic freestyle wrestling exhibition, where he and the USSR National Wrestling Team met the United States National Team (composed of both National AAU, Athletes in Action and NCAA Wrestling Team Championship winners,) the American press described him as "a blue-eyed, red-haired, 24-year-old wrestler from the Soviet Union who spreads 220 pounds over an awesome, statuesque frame that might have been hammered and chiseled out of a granite block cornerstone from the Tomb of Lenin." He was a flagbearer for the Soviet wrestling team while on the U.S. tour. When Yarygin wrestled Russell Hellickson (whom he had his shoulder disclocated at their previous match-up at the Olympics,) at Hellickson's hometown of Madison, Wisconsin, Yarygin let him up to prevent further injury, and wrestled just hard enough to protect himself until Hellickson finally fainted to pain.

After the Olympics, he won the 1973 World Championships, again all bouts by fall. Thus Yarygin became the only wrestler to win three consecutive major competitions, scoring only fall victories. He then lost several minor contests, and decided to retire from competition, settled in his native village of Sizaya, where he worked as a lumberjack in Taiga forest. Outdoor activity helped him to regain his strength and confidence, and he came back in 1974 to continue his victorious streak. His next Olympic victory in 1976 was less spectacular because he wrestled the whole tournament with two broken ribs. After that Yarygin was selected as the Soviet Olympic flag bearer at the closing ceremony.

Coming to Wilkes-Barre, Pennsylvania for the match-up versus the American National Wrestling Team, Soviet wrestlers were welcomed officially by Mayor Walter Lisman, and were given a key to Wilkes-Barre by the mayor.

Retirement
While preparing for the Moscow Olympics Yarygin realized that the young Soviet wrestler Ilya Mate has a better chance for the gold medal (which he indeed won). Yarygin retired from competition permanently in 1980 and became a wrestling coach. In 1982–92, he trained the Soviet freestyle wrestling team, and in 1993–1997 headed the Russian Wrestling Federation. He was a key organizer of the 1997 World Wrestling Championships in Krasnoyarsk.

International competition record

|-
! style=background:white colspan=8 |International competition record (incomplete)
|-
!  Res.
!  Opponent
!  Method
!  Time/Score
!  Date
!  Event
!  Location
!  Venue
|-
! style=background:white colspan=8 |
|-
|Win
|align=left| Larry Bielenberg
|style="font-size:88%"|Fall
|style="font-size:88%"|1:14
|style="font-size:88%"|1980-03-30
|rowspan=5 style="text-align:center; font-size:88%"|1980 World Cup
|rowspan=5 style="text-align:center; font-size:88%"| Toledo, Ohio
|rowspan=5 style="text-align:center; font-size:88%"|Centennial Hall
|-
|Win
|align=left| Wyatt Wishart
|
|
|style="font-size:88%"|1980-03-28
|-
|Win
|align=left| Hiroaki Obayashi
|
|
|style="font-size:88%"|1980-03-28
|-
|Win
|align=left| Bárbaro Morgan
|
|
|style="font-size:88%"|1980-03-28
|-
|Win
|align=left| Ibrahima Sarr
|
|
|style="font-size:88%"|1980-03-28
|-
|Loss
|align=left| Howard Harris
|style="font-size:88%"|Decision
|style="font-size:88%"|7–8
|style="font-size:88%"|1980-03-26
|style="text-align:center; font-size:88%"|U.S.—Soviet all-star dual meet
|style="font-size:88%"| Glens Falls, New York
|style="font-size:88%"|Glens Falls Civic Center
|-
|Win
|align=left| Fred Bohna
|style="font-size:88%"|Fall
|style="font-size:88%"|1:07
|style="font-size:88%"|1979-04-07
|style="text-align:center; font-size:88%"|Athletes in Action challenge
|style="font-size:88%"| Anaheim, California
|style="font-size:88%"|Anaheim Convention Center

|-
|Win
|align=left| 
|style="font-size:88%"|
|style="font-size:88%"|
|style="font-size:88%"|1979-04
|rowspan=2 style="text-align:center; font-size:88%"|U.S.—Soviet all-star seriesOlympic freestyle wrestling four-city tour
|style="font-size:88%"| Phoenix, Arizona
|style="font-size:88%"|
|-
|
|align=left| Larry Bielenberg
|style="font-size:88%"|Decision
|style="font-size:88%"|3–10
|style="text-align:center; font-size:88%"|1979-04-02
|style="font-size:88%"| Rapid City, South Dakota
|style="font-size:88%"|Rushmore Plaza Civic Center
|-
! style=background:white colspan=8 |
|-
|Win
|align=left| Fred Bohna
|style="font-size:88%"|Inactivity
|style="font-size:88%"|
|style="font-size:88%"|1979-04-01
|rowspan=5 style="text-align:center; font-size:88%"|1979 World Cup
|rowspan=5 style="text-align:center; font-size:88%"| Toledo, Ohio
|rowspan=5 style="text-align:center; font-size:88%"|Centennial Hall
|-
|Win
|align=left| Bárbaro Morgan
|style="font-size:88%"|
|
|style="font-size:88%"|1979-03-31
|-
|Win
|align=left| Ahmed Hamida
|style="font-size:88%"|Fall
|
|style="font-size:88%"|1979-03-31
|-
|Win
|align=left| Hiroaki Yamamoto
|style="font-size:88%"|Fall
|
|style="font-size:88%"|1979-03-31
|-
|Win
|align=left| Larry Bielenberg
|style="font-size:88%"|
|
|style="font-size:88%"|1979-03-31
|-
|Win
|align=left| John Setter
|style="font-size:88%"|Fall
|style="font-size:88%"|8:07
|style="font-size:88%"|1979-03-28
|rowspan=2 style="text-align:center; font-size:88%"|U.S.—Soviet all-star seriesOlympic freestyle wrestling four-city tour
|style="font-size:88%"| Wilkes-Barre, Pennsylvania
|style="font-size:88%"|King's College Gym
|-
|Win
|align=left|
|style="font-size:88%"|
|style="font-size:88%"|
|style="font-size:88%"|1979-03-26
|style="font-size:88%"| New York City
|style="font-size:88%"|Felt Forum
|-
! style=background:white colspan=8 |
|-
|Win
|align=left| Harold Smith
|style="font-size:88%"|Fall
|style="font-size:88%"|0:27
|style="font-size:88%"|1977-03-27
|rowspan=3 style="text-align:center; font-size:88%"|1977 World Cup
|rowspan=3 style="text-align:center; font-size:88%"| Toledo, Ohio
|rowspan=3 style="text-align:center; font-size:88%"|Centennial Hall
|-
|Win
|align=left| Steve Daniar
|style="font-size:88%"|Fall
|style="font-size:88%"|
|style="font-size:88%"|1977-03-26
|-
|Win
|align=left| Yoshiaki Yatsu
|style="font-size:88%"|Fall
|style="font-size:88%"|
|style="font-size:88%"|1977-03-26
|-
! style=background:white colspan=8 |
|-
|Win
|align=left| Russell Hellickson
|style="font-size:88%"|Decision
|style="font-size:88%"|19–13
|style="font-size:88%"|1976-07-27
|rowspan=5 style="text-align:center; font-size:88%"|1976 Summer Olympics
|rowspan=5 style="text-align:center; font-size:88%"| Montreal
|rowspan=5 style="text-align:center; font-size:88%"|Maurice Richard Arena
|-
|Win
|align=left| Petr Drozda
|style="font-size:88%"|Tech Fall
|style="font-size:88%"|5:30
|style="font-size:88%"|1976-07-27
|-
|Win
|align=left| Dimo Kostov
|style="font-size:88%"|Decision
|style="font-size:88%"|16–5
|style="font-size:88%"|1976-07-27
|-
|Win
|align=left| Daniel Verník
|style="font-size:88%"|Tech Fall
|style="font-size:88%"|1:26
|style="font-size:88%"|1976-07-27
|-
|Win
|align=left| Harald Büttner
|style="font-size:88%"|Decision
|style="font-size:88%"|13–5
|style="font-size:88%"|1976-07-27
|-
! style=background:white colspan=8 |
|-
|Win
|align=left| Dimo Kostov
|
|
|style="font-size:88%"|1976-04-18
|rowspan=3 style="text-align:center; font-size:88%"|1976 European Championship
|rowspan=3 style="text-align:center; font-size:88%"| Leningrad
|rowspan=3 style="text-align:center; font-size:88%"|Yubileyny Sports Palace
|-
|Win
|align=left| Mehmet Güçlü
|
|
|style="font-size:88%"|1976-04-18
|-
|Win
|align=left| Petr Drozda
|
|
|style="font-size:88%"|1976-04-18
|-
|Win
|align=left| 
|style="font-size:88%"|
|style="font-size:88%"|
|style="font-size:88%"|1976-03-
|rowspan=2 style="text-align:center; font-size:88%"|U.S.—Soviet all-star seriesOlympic freestyle wrestling tour
|style="font-size:88%"| Miami, Florida
|style="font-size:88%"|
|-
|Win
|align=left| Jeff Smith
|style="font-size:88%"|Fall
|style="font-size:88%"|0:23
|style="font-size:88%"|1976-03-04
|style="font-size:88%"| East Lansing, Michigan
|style="font-size:88%"|Jenison Fieldhouse
|-
! style=background:white colspan=8 |
|-
|Win
|align=left| Greg Wojciechowski
|style="font-size:88%"|
|style="font-size:88%"|
|style="font-size:88%"|1976-03-01
|rowspan=3 style="text-align:center; font-size:88%"|1976 World Cup
|rowspan=3 style="text-align:center; font-size:88%"| Toledo, Ohio
|rowspan=3 style="text-align:center; font-size:88%"|Toledo Field House
|-
|Win
|align=left| R. Sookhtsarat
|style="font-size:88%"|Decision
|style="font-size:88%"|4–2
|style="font-size:88%"|1976-02-29
|-
|Win
|align=left| Steve Daniar
|
|
|style="font-size:88%"|1976-02-29
|-
! style=background:white colspan=8 |
|-
|Win
|align=left| Harald Büttner
|
|
|style="font-size:88%"|1975-05-01
|rowspan=4 style="text-align:center; font-size:88%"|1975 European Championship
|rowspan=4 style="text-align:center; font-size:88%"| Ludwigshafen
|rowspan=4 style="text-align:center; font-size:88%"|
|-
|Win
|align=left| Dimo Kostov
|
|
|style="font-size:88%"|1975-05-01
|-
|Win
|align=left| Edward Żmudziejewski
|
|
|style="font-size:88%"|1975-05-01
|-
|Win
|align=left| Petr Drozda
|
|
|style="font-size:88%"|1975-05-01
|-
! style=background:white colspan=8 |
|-
|Loss
|align=left| Harald Büttner
|
|
|style="font-size:88%"|1974-06-24
|style="text-align:center; font-size:88%"|1974 European Championship
|style="text-align:center; font-size:88%"| Madrid
|style="text-align:center; font-size:88%"|Palacio de Deportes
|-
|Win
|align=left| 
|style="font-size:88%"|
|style="font-size:88%"|
|style="font-size:88%"|1974-04-05
|rowspan=7 style="text-align:center; font-size:88%"|U.S.—Soviet all-star seriesOlympic freestyle wrestlingsix-city tour
|style="font-size:88%"| Alexandria, Virginia
|style="font-size:88%"|
|-
|Win
|align=left| Jim Duschen
|style="font-size:88%"|Fall
|style="font-size:88%"|>3:00
|style="font-size:88%"|1974-04-02
|style="font-size:88%"| Chattanooga, Tennessee
|style="font-size:88%"|University of Tennessee Arena
|-
|Win
|align=left| Buck Deadrich
|style="font-size:88%"|Fall
|style="font-size:88%"|8:41
|style="font-size:88%"|1974-03-30
|style="font-size:88%"| Berkeley, California
|style="font-size:88%"|Harmon Gym
|-
|Win
|align=left| Larry Amundson
|style="font-size:88%"|Fall
|style="font-size:88%"|2:48
|style="font-size:88%"|1974-03-27
|style="font-size:88%"| San Diego, California
|style="font-size:88%"|Peterson Gym
|-
|
|colspan=3 style="text-align:center; font-size:88%"|Soviet wrestling clinic demonstration
|style="font-size:88%"|1974-03-23
|rowspan=2 style="font-size:88%"| Long Beach, California
|style="font-size:88%"|Long Beach State Gym
|-
|Win
|align=left| Buck Deadrich
|style="font-size:88%"|Fall
|style="font-size:88%"|>3:00
|style="font-size:88%"|1974-03-22
|style="font-size:88%"|Long Beach Arena
|-
|Win
|align=left| Buck Deadrich
|style="font-size:88%"|Fall
|style="font-size:88%"|2:34
|style="font-size:88%"|1974-03-19
|style="font-size:88%"| New York City
|style="font-size:88%"|Felt Forum
|-
! style=background:white colspan=8 |
|-
|Win
|align=left| Buck Deadrich
|style="font-size:88%"|Fall
|style="font-size:88%"|>6:00
|style="font-size:88%"|1973-09-06
|rowspan=3 style="text-align:center; font-size:88%"|1973 World Championship
|rowspan=3 style="text-align:center; font-size:88%"| Tehran
|rowspan=3 style="text-align:center; font-size:88%"|Aryamehr Indoor Stadium
|-
|Win
|align=left| József Csatári
|style="font-size:88%"|Fall
|style="font-size:88%"|
|style="font-size:88%"|1973-09-09
|-
|Win
|align=left| Dimitar Nekov
|style="font-size:88%"|Fall
|
|style="font-size:88%"|1973-09-06
|-
! style=background:white colspan=8 |
|-
|Win
|align=left| Buck Deadrich
|
|
|style="font-size:88%"|1973-08-15
|rowspan=2 style="text-align:center; font-size:88%"|1973 World University Games
|rowspan=2 style="text-align:center; font-size:88%"| Moscow
|rowspan=2 style="text-align:center; font-size:88%"|Lenin Palace of Sports
|-
|Win
|align=left| Dimitar Stankov
|
|
|style="font-size:88%"|1973-08-15
|-
|Win
|align=left| Henk Schenk
|style="font-size:88%"|Decision
|style="font-size:88%"|6–3
|style="font-size:88%"|1973-06-01
|rowspan=4 style="text-align:center; font-size:88%"|U.S.—Soviet all-star seriesOlympic freestyle wrestlingfour-city tour
|style="font-size:88%"| New York City
|style="font-size:88%"|Felt Forum
|-
|Win
|align=left| Nick Curollo
|style="font-size:88%"|Fall
|style="font-size:88%"|1:04
|style="font-size:88%"|1973-05-30
|style="font-size:88%"| Brockport, New York
|style="font-size:88%"|Brockport State Gym
|-
|Win
|align=left| Greg Wojciechowski
|style="font-size:88%"|Decision
|style="font-size:88%"|3–1
|style="font-size:88%"|1973-05-26
|style="font-size:88%"| Columbus, Ohio
|style="font-size:88%"|St. John Arena
|-
|Win
|align=left| Russell Hellickson
|style="font-size:88%"|Default (9–0)
|style="font-size:88%"|>6:00
|style="font-size:88%"|1973-05-23
|style="font-size:88%"| Madison, Wisconsin
|style="font-size:88%"|Wisconsin Field House
|-
! style=background:white colspan=8 |
|-
|Win
|align=left| Russell Hellickson
|style="font-size:88%"|Fall
|style="font-size:88%"|1:56
|style="font-size:88%"|1973-05-20
|rowspan=3 style="text-align:center; font-size:88%"|1973 World Cup
|rowspan=3 style="text-align:center; font-size:88%"| Toledo, Ohio
|rowspan=3 style="text-align:center; font-size:88%"|Toledo Field House
|-
|Win
|align=left| Claude Pilon
|style="font-size:88%"|Fall
|style="font-size:88%"|0:17
|style="font-size:88%"|1973-05-19
|-
|Win
|align=left| Shizuo Yada
|style="font-size:88%"|Fall
|style="font-size:88%"|
|style="font-size:88%"|1973-05-19
|-
! style=background:white colspan=8 |
|-
|Win
|align=left| József Csatári
|style="font-size:88%"|Fall
|style="font-size:88%"|2:04
|style="font-size:88%"|1972-08-31
|rowspan=7 style="text-align:center; font-size:88%"|1972 Summer Olympics
|rowspan=7 style="text-align:center; font-size:88%"| Munich
|rowspan=7 style="text-align:center; font-size:88%"|Messe München
|-
|Win
|align=left| Khorloo Bayanmunkh
|style="font-size:88%"|Fall
|style="font-size:88%"|5:21
|style="font-size:88%"|1972-08-31
|-
|Win
|align=left| Enache Panait
|style="font-size:88%"|Fall
|style="font-size:88%"|1:47
|style="font-size:88%"|1972-08
|-
|Win
|align=left| Abolfazl Anvari
|style="font-size:88%"|Fall
|style="font-size:88%"|2:58
|style="font-size:88%"|1972-08
|-
|Win
|align=left| Harry Geris
|style="font-size:88%"|Fall
|style="font-size:88%"|2:20
|style="font-size:88%"|1972-08
|-
|Win
|align=left| Gerd Bachmann
|style="font-size:88%"|Fall
|style="font-size:88%"|2:11
|style="font-size:88%"|1972-08
|-
|Win
|align=left| Bruno Jutzeler
|style="font-size:88%"|Fall
|style="font-size:88%"|0:27
|style="font-size:88%"|1972-08-27
|-
! style=background:white colspan=8 |
|-
|Win
|align=left| Vasil Todorov
|Fall
|
|style="font-size:88%"|1972-04-24
|rowspan=3 style="text-align:center; font-size:88%"|1972 European Championship
|rowspan=3 style="text-align:center; font-size:88%"| Katowice
|rowspan=3 style="text-align:center; font-size:88%"|Spodek Arena
|-
|Win
|align=left| Gerd Bachmann
|Fall
|
|style="font-size:88%"|1972-04-24
|-
|Win
|align=left| Enache Panait
|Fall
|
|style="font-size:88%"|1972-04-24
|-
! style=background:white colspan=8 |
|-
|Loss
|align=left| Ahmet Ayık
|
|
|style="font-size:88%"|1970-06-09
|rowspan=5 style="text-align:center; font-size:88%"|1970 European Championship
|rowspan=5 style="text-align:center; font-size:88%"| East Berlin
|rowspan=5 style="text-align:center; font-size:88%"|
|-
|Win
|align=left| Vasil Todorov
|style="font-size:88%"|Fall
|
|style="font-size:88%"|1970-06-09
|-
|Win
|align=left| Gerd Bachmann
|style="font-size:88%"|Fall
|
|style="font-size:88%"|1970-06-09
|-
|Win
|align=left| Enache Panait
|style="font-size:88%"|Fall
|
|style="font-size:88%"|1970-06-09
|-
|Win
|align=left| Karel Engel
|style="font-size:88%"|Fall
|
|style="font-size:88%"|1970-06-09

Death and legacy

Yarygin was killed in a car crash in 1997, crashing his car into a roadside-parked heavy truck. Earlier in 1990, an annual wrestling tournament in his honor has been initiated in Krasnoyarsk, the city where he lived since 1966; in 1998 a sports venue in Krasnoyarsk has been renamed into the Ivan Yarygin Sports Palace, and in March 2002 his monument was opened in the city. His other monuments were installed in Moscow in 1998, in Stavropol Krai (near the place of his death) in 2012, and in Abakan in 2013. A secondary school and a wrestling complex in Moscow are named after Yarygin. In 2010 Yarygin was inducted into the FILA International Wrestling Hall of Fame.

Books
Yarygin I. S. (1989) Ты выходишь на ковер. Moscow. 
Yarygin I. S. (1995) Суровые мужские игры. Krasnoyarsk.

References

External links

1948 births
1997 deaths
People from Kemerovo Oblast
Soviet male sport wrestlers
Olympic wrestlers of the Soviet Union
Wrestlers at the 1972 Summer Olympics
Wrestlers at the 1976 Summer Olympics
Russian male sport wrestlers
Russian sambo practitioners
Olympic gold medalists for the Soviet Union
Olympic medalists in wrestling
Road incident deaths in Russia
World Wrestling Champions
Medalists at the 1976 Summer Olympics
Medalists at the 1972 Summer Olympics
Burials in Troyekurovskoye Cemetery
Universiade medalists in wrestling
Universiade gold medalists for the Soviet Union
European Wrestling Championships medalists
Sportspeople from Kemerovo Oblast